Bridell is a small settlement and parish in north Pembrokeshire, Wales. The parish includes the village of Pen-y-bryn. Together with the parishes of Cilgerran and Llantood, it is in the community of Cilgerran.

Bridell Parish

The derivation of the parish name is obscure. Lying on the western border of the cantref of Emlyn, it has always been essentially Welsh-speaking. Bridell (as Brydelthe) appears on a 1578 parish map of Pembrokeshire.

The stone is believed to be 5th century, and was probably "Chritianised" with a cross later. The language is Ogham.

Official census figures were: 248 (1801): 335 (1851): 237 (1901): 220 (1951): 221 (1981) with the proportion of Welsh speakers 94 per cent (1891), 90 per cent (1931) and 51 per cent (1971). In 1890, local clergy were reported to be in "great distress" through the failure to collect tithes amounting to £1,738 over six parishes, with Bridell owed £249; previous attempts at recovery had been "crushed by riotous crowds".

Pen-y-bryn

Pen-y-Bryn (English meaning: top of the hill), also referred to as Penybryn, is a small village situated on the northern side of the parish at a crossroads dominated by the Pen-y-Bryn Arms public house on one side and the Grade II-listed Penybryn Baptist Chapel, established in 1818 and rebuilt in 1869, on the other.

Pen-y-bryn has outgrown Bridell owing to a building surge in the latter part of the 20th century driven both by local need and by immigration from other parts of Wales and the UK.

The Pen-y-bryn Arms has stood at the crossroads at least since the 18th century and enjoys both local and passing trade, standing as it does on the main route into Cardigan from the south. The site formerly included a petrol station and garage, both now closed. There is a Victorian post box embedded in the front wall.

References

External links 
Further information and sources on GENUKI

Villages in Pembrokeshire